195 Lewis (pronounced One Nine Five Lewis) is an American comedy-drama web series created by Rae Leone Allen and Yaani Supreme, and co-written with Terence Nance and director Chanelle Aponte Pearson. It follows several Black queer women (played by Allen, Sirita Wright, Roxie Johnson, and D. Ajane Carlton) living in Bedford–Stuyvesant, Brooklyn (Bed-Stuy). The series was released online on its website, One Nine Five Lewis, on November 16, 2017. It received the 2018 Gotham Award for Breakthrough Series and a Special Mention at Outfest 2017.

Plot 
195 Lewis centers on a close-knit group of Black queer women navigating relationships in Bed-Stuy, Brooklyn. The series features topics such as sex positivity and polyamory.

Cast and characters
 Rae Leone Allen as Yuri, an artist and Camille's girlfriend
 Sirita Wright as Camille, Yuri's girlfriend who recently completed her PhD
 Roxie Johnson as Kris, a recent transplant from Texas and Yuri's former college girlfriend
 D. Ajane Carlton as Stacy-Anne, a womanizer and Camille's younger sister
 Trae Harris as Harlem, Yuri's love interest

Production 
Yaani Lewis and Rae Leone Allen created and wrote the initial script for 195 Lewis. The series reflects Lewis and Allen's experiences as Black queer women living in Brooklyn. The title refers to the address where they lived at the time with the street name changed.

In 2014, they approached Terence Nance's production company, MVMT, about the project and his business partner Chanelle Aponte Pearson requested to work on it. Pearson received the Gotham Awards’ "Spotlight on Women Filmmakers Live The Dream" grant to further develop the series. It is her directorial debut. Allen stated that they had difficulty garnering interest in the project, and most of the crew and actors had little experience in television and film production.

Nance and Pearson co-wrote and developed the script, and Jomo Fray was the director of photography. Filming was on-location in Bed-Stuy. Fray's cinematography frequently featured "bright, neon, and stylized" lighting.

Release and reception 
The pilot premiered at the BlackStar Film Festival in 2014. It was later re-shot and the full five episodes of the series premiered on its website on November 16, 2017.

195 Lewis received positive reception. In a review for IndieWire Jude Dry wrote, "Director Chanelle Aponte Pearson makes a confident and splashy debut, catapulting her considerable producing skills to a new level." Writing for Vice, Emily J. Smith stated, "While 195 intentionally tackles complex subjects like polyamory, sex positivity, and misogyny in lesbian culture, it's not in the way you might expect. The cast of characters allows for conflicting perspectives—even in this very specific world—so viewers are invited into a real conversation instead of a lecture."

Awards and nominations 
 2017 – Outfest, U.S. Narrative Special Mention
 2017 – BlackStar Film Festival, Audience Award for Favorite Narrative Feature
 2018 – Gotham Award, Breakthrough Series – Short Form

References

External links 
 
 

2017 web series debuts
2017 web series endings
2010s American black television series
2010s American comedy-drama television series
2010s American LGBT-related comedy television series
2010s American LGBT-related drama television series
American comedy web series
American drama web series
Lesbian-related television shows
Polyamory in fiction